The Steiermärkische Bank und Sparkassen AG (mostly called Steiermärkische Sparkasse for short) was founded in 1825 as Vereinssparkasse (Steyermärkische Spar-Casse) and is thus the oldest financial institution in Styria. Business operations began on 15 May 1825 at the first business premises at Landhaus, Schmiedgasse No. 9. The actual founder of the Steiermärkische Sparkasse was the Emperor's personal representative and Governor in Styria: Franz von Hartig. Since 1823 he had been the Imperial and Royal Count of Styria, Governor of Styria and thus head of the Imperial and Royal Styrian Gubernium, the country's highest political authority. In addition to his political responsibilities, he also was in a role inspired him to found a Sparkasse in Graz. Since 1823 he had been a member of the Association of the First Austrian Spar-Casse with direct insight into the beginnings of the Sparkassen system in Austria. As early as 1824 he had decided to found an institute of this kind in Styria as well.

History
 On 12 February 1825 the subscribers decided to establish a "Steyermärkische Spar-Casse zu Gratz" and its statute and elected its first organs.
 On 2 March 1825 the statutes were approved by the Gubernium for Styria (Zl. 4840) and the members of the permanent committee were elected.
 On 5 May 1825, by decree of the United Court Chancellery in Vienna, permission was granted to operate this first financial institution in Graz.
 On 15 May 1825 at 10 o'clock in the morning the opening took place in the rooms of the business premises at the Landhaus.
 The first client was the protector of the Sparkasse, Count von Hartig, who paid an amount of 100 fl. C.M. with a dedication.
 The first employees of the Sparkasse were Peter Lingl (cashier) and Ignaz Dissauer (accountant). However, their previous employer Carl Freiherr von Mandell continued to pay their salary.
 On 24 March 1838 Archduke John of Austria visited the Sparkasse accompanied by the Minister of State Count von Kolowrat.
 On 1 April 1885 the Steiermärkische Sparkasse moved into their new premises, built according to plans by Matthias Seidl, in which the (older) Stephaniensaal was also built and made available to the public.
 The Steiermärkische Sparkasse in Graz emerged from "the transfer of the Sparkasse des Bezirks Umgebung Graz and the Gemeinde-Sparkasse in Graz to the old Steiermärkische Sparkasse by universal succession in 1939".
 From 1965 expansion in Styria -– acquisition of 20 Sparkasse
 In 1991 it was incorporated into a Joint-stock company.
 1992 Merger of Steiermärkische Sparkasse and Steiermärkische Bank
 From 1997 Expansion in the Western Balkans
 2000 Takeover of Erste Bank branches in Styria

Company profile
Steiermärkische Bank und Sparkassen AG was founded in 1825 as an association savings bank and was thus the first financial institution in Styria. It is a universal bank with services for private clients, small and medium-sized enterprises, private banking clients, large companies, institutional clients and the public sector. With a balance sheet total of €15 billion, it is the largest retail bank in Styria. The expanded home market includes Macedonia, Bosnia and Herzegovina, Montenegro, Croatia, Serbia and Slovenia. Steiermärkische Sparkasse is the largest regional Sparkasse in Austria and an important part of the Austrian Sparkassen Gruppe, which consists of 46 Sparkassen with Erste Group Bank and Erste Bank Österreich as leading institutions. It is also a member of the Sparkassen Haftungsverbund.

Steiermärkische Bank und Sparkassen AG has its headquarters at Am Sparkassenplatz in Graz. 73.5% of the shares in the company are held by "Steiermärkische Verwaltungssparkasse", 25% by "Erste Bank" and 1.5% by the employees.

With a balance sheet total of EUR 15.7 billion, the Steiermärkische Sparkasse Group is the largest Sparkasse in Styria and the largest Sparkasse in southern Austria. The Sparkasse employs 2,785 staff and operates 233 locations. (as of 2018)

Literature
 Wilhelm Kaiserfeld and Heinrich Poschacher, Die Steiermärkische Sparkasse 1825–1925. Eine Denkschrift anlässlich ihres hundertjährigen Bestandes, Graz 1925
 Werner Rauchenwald: Banken in Graz; Leykam-BranchenverlagsgmbH (Hrsg.) 2007

References

External links
 Official Website

Banks of Austria
Corporate finance
Companies based in Graz
1991 establishments in Austria